Mynydd Bach, Ceredigion is a hamlet in the community of Pontarfynach, Ceredigion, Wales, which is 68.5 miles (110.3 km) from Cardiff and 170.7 miles (274.7 km) from London. Mynydd Bach is represented in the Senedd by Elin Jones (Plaid Cymru) and is part of the Ceredigion constituency in the House of Commons.

References

See also 
 Bontnewydd, Ceredigion
 List of Scheduled prehistoric Monuments in Ceredigion - two cairns on Mynydd Bach
 List of localities in Wales by population 

Villages in Ceredigion